This is a list of wars involving the Argentine Republic and its predecessor states from the colonial period to present day.

Inca Empire

Colonial Argentina (1536–1810)

United Provinces of the Río de la Plata (1810–1831)

Argentine Confederation (1831–1861)

Argentine Republic (1861–present)

See also
 List of hostile incidents at the Argentine border

Notes

References

Bibliography
 
 

 
Argentina
Wars